"Rumble" is an instrumental by American group Link Wray & His Ray Men. Released in the United States on March 31, 1958, as a single (with "The Swag" as a B-side), "Rumble" utilized the techniques of distortion and tremolo, then largely unexplored in rock and roll. 

In 2018, the song was inducted into the Rock and Roll Hall of Fame in a new category for singles.

History
At a live gig in Fredericksburg, Virginia, in early 1958, while attempting to work up a backing for The Diamonds' "The Stroll", Link Wray & His Ray Men came up with the instrumental "Rumble", which they originally called "Oddball". It was an instant hit with the audience, which demanded four repeats that night. The host of the sock hop, disc jockey Milt Grant, paid for the song to be recorded and released as a single; in turn, Grant would receive songwriting credit.

Eventually the instrumental came to the attention of record producer Archie Bleyer of Cadence Records, who hated it, particularly after Wray poked a pencil through the cone of his amplifier to make the recording sound more like the live version. But Bleyer's stepdaughter loved it, so he released it despite his misgivings. Phil Everly heard it and suggested the title "Rumble", as it had a rough sound and said it sounded like a street fight.

It was banned in several US radio markets, because the term 'rumble' was a slang term for a gang fight, and it was feared that the piece's harsh sound glorified juvenile delinquency. The record is the only instrumental single ever banned from radio in the United States.

Chart performance
"Rumble" was a hit in the United States, where it climbed to number 16 on the pop charts and number 11 on the R&B chart in the summer of 1958.

Covers and later versions 
The Dave Clark Five covered it in 1964 on their first album, A Session with The Dave Clark Five; it also appeared on The Dave Clark Five Return!, their second American album.

Another recording of the instrumental was released by Wray in 1968 as "Rumble '68", and again in 1969 as "Rumble-69" (Mr. G Records, G-820). In 2014 jazz guitarist Bill Frisell released a cover of "Rumble" on his album Guitar in the Space Age!

Influence

Bob Dylan once referred to "Rumble" as "the best instrumental ever", and the piece has remained widely used in various entertainment media. It has been used in movies, documentaries, television shows, and elsewhere, including Top Gear, The Warriors (in the deleted opening scene), Pulp Fiction, Screaming Yellow Theater with host Svengoolie, Independence Day, SpongeBob SquarePants vs. The Big One, Blow, the pilot episode of the HBO series The Sopranos, StarCraft II: Wings of Liberty, Riding Giants, Roadracers, and Wild Zero.

In the 2008 documentary, It Might Get Loud, featuring guitarists Jimmy Page, The Edge, and Jack White, Page, the Led Zeppelin founder and guitarist, appears playing a 45 rpm single of "Rumble," apparently from his personal collection. Page discusses the record, and performs air guitar along with it. Intercut with this footage is a portion of a conversation between the three guitarists, in which Page talks about listening to, "anything with a guitar on, when I was a kid [...] but the first time I heard "The Rumble" [sic], that was something that had so much profound attitude to it."

"Rumble" was sampled by experimental hip-hop trio Death Grips in "Spread Eagle Cross the Block" from their 2011 mixtape Exmilitary.

In an interview with Stephen Colbert on April 29, 2013, Iggy Pop stated that he "left school emotionally" at the moment he first heard "Rumble" at the student union, leading him to pursue music as a career.

The title of the record serves as the title of the 2017 documentary film Rumble: The Indians Who Rocked the World which features, amongst others, the work of Wray and his impact on rock music as a man of Native American descent.

The 1980 Adam and the Ants song "Killer in the Home", from their Kings of the Wild Frontier album, is based on the same refrain that is featured in "Rumble" (Ants guitarist Marco Pirroni has cited Link Wray as a major influence).

References

External links
 Library of Congress essay

1958 singles
1958 songs
Cadence Records singles
Link Wray songs
Rock instrumentals
United States National Recording Registry recordings
1950s instrumentals